The 2019–20 season was Ipswich Town's first season back in the third tier of English football after relegation in the 2018–19 season and 142nd year in existence. Along with competing in EFL League One, the club also participated in the FA Cup, EFL Cup and EFL Trophy. The season covers the period from 1 July 2019 to 30 June 2020.

On 1 January 2020, Paul Lambert signed a new 5-year contract with the club until 2025.

On 13 March the season was suspended until further notice due to the Coronavirus outbreak. The season ultimately never resumed, and the final table was determined on a points-per-game basis after the club's voted to end the season on 9 June 2020.

Season summary

Pre-season
The 2019–20 season saw Ipswich compete in the third tier of English football for the first time since 1957. Ipswich started the 2019–20 season as one of the promotion favorites following relegation from the EFL Championship in the 2018–19 season. The club's pre-season began in Germany with a 12-day training camp from 4 to 15 July. After returning from Germany Ipswich scheduled pre-season friendlies with a number of English sides. New signings including Tomáš Holý and James Norwood saw a change to the first-team squad, following the departure of a number of first team players at the end of the previous season.

August to December
The season began on the 3 August, with Ipswich traveling away to face Burton Albion at the Pirelli Stadium. Ipswich made a positive start to the season with a 1–0 victory in the season opener away at Burton. The following week saw Ipswich host Sunderland in the club's first home game of the season at Portman Road. After being in control for the majority of the game Ipswich conceded a second-half equalizer to cancel out a first-half goal from new loan signing Luke Garbutt, drawing the game 1–1. Ipswich exited the EFL Cup in the first round, following a 1–3 away loss to Luton Town on 13 August. Ipswich began the season in exceptional form, going on an eleven-game unbeaten run during the first quarter of the season, reaching the top of the table following a 5–0 win away at Bolton Wanderers on 24 August. Ipswich went the first two months of the season unbeaten in the league, with a 1–0 win away at Fleetwood Town keeping the team top of the league going into the first international break of the season, while manager Paul Lambert also won the EFL League One Manager of the Month award for August. Ipswich suffered their first defeat of the season after returning from the international break, suffering a 0–2 away loss to Accrington Stanley. A first home defeat of the season against Rotherham United saw a stutter in form, although back-to-back away wins over Southend United and Rochdale kept Ipswich top of the division going into November. Summer signing Kane Vincent-Young picked up a groin injury during the win away at Fleetwood, which forced him to leave the field. Despite early expectation that the injury would be minor, it was announced that Vincent-Young would require surgery on the injury, ruling him out for an estimated three months. Ipswich began their 2019–20 FA Cup campaign on 9 November after being drawn at home to divisional rivals Lincoln City, with the first round match ending in a 1–1 draw, setting up a replay as a result. The replay took place on 20 November at Sincil Bank. A 94th-minute winner from Alan Judge saw Ipswich win their first FA Cup match since January 2010. Ipswich were drawn away at Coventry City in the second round, which was scheduled to take place on 3 December.

Ipswich suffered from a poor run of form over November and December, starting with a 2–2 draw at home to Blackpool followed by a 0–0 draw with then league leaders Wycombe Wanderers, with a goal by Ipswich captain Luke Chambers being controversially ruled out for offside. Ipswich did however progress in the EFL Trophy, with the 2019–20 season being the first time Ipswich had entered the competition in the club's history. After finishing second in the group stage, Ipswich were drawn away to Peterborough United on 4 December. Ipswich progressed into the third round after beating Peterborough 6–5 on penalties following a 1–1 draw, with debutante Adam Przybek saving two penalties in the shoot-out. Despite progression in the EFL Trophy, the poor league run continued as Ipswich failed to win in eight consecutive league games from mid November to New Year's Day, including an FA Cup exit to Coventry City on 10 December following a replay after a 1–1 draw. Ipswich also exited the EFL Trophy in the third round, following a 1–2 away loss to Exeter City.

January to March
Despite the poor run of results, on 1 January it was announced that Paul Lambert had signed a four-year contract extension with the club, extending his contract until 2025. Ipswich's next league win did not come until 11 January, with a 4–1 win at home to Accrington Stanley. January saw an upturn in form, with a draw away at Oxford United being followed by a 2–1 away win over Tranmere Rovers at Prenton Park, in which Ipswich came from behind in the second half to win the match. The following match saw Ipswich beat Lincoln City 1–0 at Portman Road, returning Ipswich to the top of the League One table for the first time since November. The following league match was a top of the table clash between Ipswich and second-placed Rotherham United. Ipswich suffered a 0–1 defeat at the New York Stadium. The following run saw a huge decline in results for Ipswich, defeats to promotion rivals Peterborough United and Sunderland followed by a 0–0 draw away to AFC Wimbledon. Ipswich suffered another injury blow on 21 February, when it was announced that James Norwood would require surgery on an adductor injury, adding to long term first-team injuries to Kane Vincent-Young, Danny Rowe, Jack Lankester and Tristan Nydam. A 4–1 win at home to Burton Albion followed four league defeats in a row to see Ipswich drop to 10th in the table, after being in the top six of the league from August through to February.

Season postponement
On 13 March the season was suspended until further notice due to the Coronavirus outbreak. After months of uncertainty, it was announced on 9 June that the season would ultimately not resume, with the final league table being determined on a points-per-game basis after the League One club's voting to end the season. Ipswich dropped a further place to 11th in League One, representing the club's lowest league finish since the 1952–53 season.

Kits
Supplier: Adidas / Sponsor: Magical Vegas (chest), East Anglian Air Ambulance (back), Nicholas Estates (shorts)

First-team squad
Age listed below are accurate as of 4 May 2020

First-team coaching staff

Pre-season
The club's pre-season schedule was confirmed in June 2019. The club's pre-season schedule also included a 12-day training camp in Germany, from 4 to 15 July.

Friendlies

Interwetten Cup
The Interwetten Cup is a four team pre-season friendly tournament hosted by German side SV Meppen at their home ground, the Hänsch-Arena in Meppen, Germany. The tournament features four teams, including hosts SV Meppen, with teams playing 45 minute semi-finals, with the winner of each semi-final progressing into another 45 minute final. The two losing teams then take part in a 45-minute 3rd place play-off to decide the final position for each team. The teams competing in the 2019 Interwetten Cup included Ipswich Town, Fortuna Düsseldorf, SV Meppen and FC Utrecht. The two semi-finals featured Fortuna Düsseldorf against Ipswich Town, with Fortuna emerging 4–1 winners, and SV Meppen against FC Utrecht, with Utrecht winning 5–4 on penalties, after the semi-final match finished in a 0–0 draw. The final of the tournament was contested by FC Utrecht and Fortuna Düsseldorf, with Utrecht winning the Interwetten Cup following a 1–0 win over Fortuna in the tournament final. Hosts SV Meppen finished third following a 3–1 penalty shootout win over Ipswich Town, after the 3rd place play-off match finished in a 0–0 draw.

Competitions

EFL League One

League table

Results summary

Results by matchday

Matches

FA Cup

The first round draw was made on 21 October 2019. The second round draw was made live on 11 November from Chichester City's stadium, Oaklands Park.

EFL Cup

The first round draw was made on 20 June 2019.

EFL Trophy

On 9 July 2019, the pre-determined group stage draw was announced with Invited clubs to be drawn on 12 July 2019. The draw for the second round was made on 16 November 2019 live on Sky Sports. The draw for the third round was made on 5 December 2019 live on Sky Sports.

Group stage

Second round

Third round

Transfers

Transfers in

Loans in

Transfers out

Loans out

New contracts

Players

Coaching staff

Squad statistics
All statistics updated as of end of season

Appearances and goals

|-
! colspan=14 style=background:#dcdcdc; text-align:center| Goalkeepers

|-
! colspan=14 style=background:#dcdcdc; text-align:center| Defenders

|-
! colspan=14 style=background:#dcdcdc; text-align:center| Midfielders

|-
! colspan=14 style=background:#dcdcdc; text-align:center| Forwards

|-
! colspan=14 style=background:#dcdcdc; text-align:center| Players transferred out during the season

|-

Goalscorers

Assists

Clean sheets

Disciplinary record

Suspensions

Starting 11
Considering starts in all competitions

Captains

Awards

Greene King Player of the Month
Ipswich Town official player of the month award.

EFL League One Manager of the Month

PFA Fans' League One Player of the Month

References

Ipswich Town
Ipswich Town F.C. seasons